Hyde Park Corner is a 1935 British comedy crime film, directed by Sinclair Hill and starring Gordon Harker, Binnie Hale and Eric Portman. Harker portrays a policeman investigating a crime in 1930s London, which proves to have its origins in the 1780s. The film takes its name from Hyde Park Corner in Central London where the events of the film occur. It was based on a play by Walter C. Hackett. The film was made at Welwyn Studios.

Synopsis
In the 1780s, after an evening of illegal gambling, two of the participants fight a duel in which the wronged party is killed by a villain, who has just cheated to win a newly built house at Hyde Park Corner from him. Officer Cheatle of the Bow Street Runners is able to arrest those present for gambling, but is unable to prove that a murder has occurred.

A hundred and fifty years later, the Officer's great-grandson, Constable Cheatle, is intrigued by reports of another murder at the same house at Hyde Park Corner. Cheatle sees this as a way of fulfilling his ambition to join the plainclothes detective branch. His attempts to solve the case are initially interrupted by Sophie, a petty criminal whom he arrests while she is shoplifting in a department store. Eventually, with her help, he is able to uncover the true culprit of the crime that has its roots in the fatal evening in the eighteenth century.

Cast
 Gordon Harker as Constable Cheatle
 Binnie Hale as Sophie
 Eric Portman as Edward Chester
 Gibb McLaughlin as Sir Arthur Gannett
 Harry Tate as Taxi Driver
 Robert Holmes as Concannon
 Eileen Peel as Barbara Ainsworth
 Donald Wolfit as Howard

References

Bibliography
 Low, Rachael. Filmmaking in 1930s Britain. George Allen & Unwin, 1985.
 Wood, Linda. British Films, 1927-1939. British Film Institute, 1986.

External links

1935 films
British crime comedy-drama films
British drama films
British historical comedy-drama films
1930s crime comedy-drama films
1930s historical comedy-drama films
British films based on plays
Films set in London
Films set in the 1780s
Films set in the 1930s
Films directed by Sinclair Hill
Films shot at Welwyn Studios
British black-and-white films
1930s English-language films
1930s British films